The 1979 Atlantic Coast Conference men's basketball tournament was held in Greensboro, North Carolina, at the Greensboro Coliseum from March 1–3. North Carolina defeated Duke, 71–63, to win the championship. Dudley Bradley of North Carolina was named the tournament MVP.

With the exception of the 1991 tournament, when  was ineligible to participate due to NCAA sanctions, the 1979 event was the final ACC Tournament scheduled as a seven-team event and the final time the top seed received an automatic bye into the semifinals.

Bracket

References

Tournament
ACC men's basketball tournament
College sports tournaments in North Carolina
Basketball competitions in Greensboro, North Carolina
ACC men's basketball tournament
ACC men's basketball tournament